Sabahtortrix is a genus of moths belonging to the family Tortricidae. It contains only one species, Sabahtortrix montana, which is found on Sabah in Malaysia. The habitat consists of primary montane forests.

The wingspan is 16–18 mm. The ground colour of the forewings is whitish, cream along the costa preserved as some spots, otherwise suffused green. There are some black-brown dots and refractive spots and there is subterminal grey suffusion in the dorsosubterminal area. The hindwings are cream brown with rust-brown hairs and suffusion at the base.

Etymology
The genus name is a combination of the name of the country and the name of the type-genus of the tribe. The species name refers to the topography of the type locality and is derived from Latin montanus (meaning mountainous).

See also
List of Tortricidae genera

References

External links
tortricidae.com

Tortricini